Olin Pierre Louis is a Haitian Roman Catholic priest in San Juan, Puerto Rico. Louis was named the parish priest of la iglesia Nuestra Señora de la Providencia in San Juan by Roberto González Nieves, the leader of the Roman Catholic Church in Puerto Rico. Pierre Louis is known for providing support and advocating for Haitian and Dominican immigrants in Puerto Rico.

Early life 
Olin Pierre Louis Noelsaint is originally from Haiti.

Career 

Pierre Louis arrived in Puerto Rico in 2000. He was ordained by archbishop Roberto González Nieves on 24 March 2009. Pierre Louis was the pastor of Church of San Mateo de Cangrejos of Santurce in Santurce, Puerto Rico for 5 years. 

In 2014, he reported that his church received approximately 600 Haitian immigrants as they were en route to the United States and Francophone regions of Canada. He is an advocate for the Dominican immigrant population in Puerto Rico. He houses Haitian migrants and raises money uses his congregation to raise money to purchase tickets to Miami and New York. In July 2015, Pierre Louis was named the parish priest of la iglesia Nuestra Señora de la Providencia in San Juan.

Personal life 
Pierre Louis' first language is Haitian Creole.

See also
 
 List of Haitians
 Catholic Church in the United States

References

External links 
 Interview with the University of Puerto Rico, Río Piedras School of Communication
 Interview with Primera Hora

20th-century Haitian people
Living people
Year of birth missing (living people)
Haitian emigrants to Puerto Rico
Haitian Roman Catholic priests